Parmouti 2 - Coptic Calendar - Parmouti 4

The third day of the Coptic month of Parmouti, the eighth month of the Coptic year. In common years, this day corresponds to March 29, of the Julian Calendar, and April 11, of the Gregorian Calendar. This day falls in the Coptic Season of Shemu, the season of the Harvest.

Commemorations

Saints 

 The departure of Pope Michael II, 71st Patriarch of the See of Saint Mark 
 The departure of Saint John, Bishop of Jerusalem

References 

Days of the Coptic calendar